I Am Suzanne! is a 1933 American pre-Code romance film involving puppeteers in Paris written by Edwin Justus Mayer, directed by Rowland V. Lee,  and starring Lilian Harvey, Gene Raymond and Leslie Banks. The picture's puppetry sequences feature the Yale Puppeteers and Podrecca's Piccoli Theater. The Museum of Modern Art in New York City owns and periodically exhibits a 35mm print of the film while the Eastman House in Rochester, New York, archives a 16mm copy.

Cast

 Lilian Harvey - Suzanne
 Gene Raymond - Tony Malatini
 Leslie Banks - Adolphe 'Baron' Herring
 Georgia Caine - Mama
 Murray Kinnell - Luigi Malatini
 Geneva Mitchell - Fifi
 Halliwell Hobbes - Dr. Lorenzo
 Edward Keane - Manager
 Lionel Belmore - Satan
 Lynn Bari - Audience member (uncredited)

Reception
The film was not a success at the box office.

References

External links

1933 films
1930s romantic musical films
American musical drama films
American romantic drama films
American romantic musical films
American black-and-white films
Films directed by Rowland V. Lee
Films scored by Friedrich Hollaender
Fox Film films
1930s American films
Silent romantic drama films